Sir Elijah Impey (13 June 17321 October 1809) was a British judge, the first chief justice of the Supreme Court of Judicature at Fort William in Bengal, Chief Justice of the Sadr Diwani Adalat and MP for New Romney.

Life

He was born the youngest son of Elijah Impey and his wife Martha, daughter of James Fraser and was educated at Westminster School with Warren Hastings, who was his intimate friend throughout life. He proceeded to Trinity College, Cambridge in 1752, graduating in 1756 as the second Chancellor's classical medallist.

Impey was called to the bar in 1756. He was appointed the first chief justice of the new supreme court at Calcutta in March 1774 and knighted later that month.

En route to India he learned Bengali and Urdu, and once there studied Persian. With his wife Mary (née Reade), from 1777, he hired local artists to paint the various birds, animals and native plants, life-sized where possible, and in natural surrounds.  The collection is often known as the Impey Album.

In 1775 he presided at the trial of Maharaja Nandakumar, who was accused of forging a bond in an attempt to deprive a widow of more than half her inheritance. As a result of the trial he went down in history, because in 1787 he was subjected to impeachment, along with Warren Hastings, for their conduct of the case. He was accused by Macaulay of conspiring with Hastings to commit a judicial murder by having unjustly hanged Nandakumar; but the whole question of the trial of Nandakumar was examined in detail by Sir James Fitzjames Stephen, who stated that "no man ever had, or could have, a fairer trial than Nuncomar, and Impey in particular behaved with absolute fairness and as much indulgence as was compatible with his duty." According to Macaulay, Impey later applied English law so aggressively as to "throw a great country into the most dreadful confusion", until in effect bribed by Hastings to desist.

In 1790 Impey was returned to Parliament as the member for New Romney constituency and spent the next seven years as an MP before retiring to Newick Park near Brighton. He died there in 1809 and was buried in the family vault at St Paul's, Hammersmith, London. With his wife he is commemorated in the church with a wall monument by Peter Rouw. He had married on 18 January 1768 Mary, daughter of Sir John Reade, 5th Baronet, of Shipton Court, Oxfordshire; they had five sons.

In 1795 his application for a fellowship of the Royal Society was rejected.

Legacy 

A portrait of Impey, by Johan Zoffany hangs in Kolkata High Court. Tilly Kettle, Thomas Lawrence and William Beechey also painted him.

His wife, Mary Impey, is commemorated in the name of the Impeyan pheasant (Lophophorus impejanus).

Further reading
James Fitzjames Stephen, The Story of Nuncomar and the Impeachment of Sir Elijah Impey (1885).
Memoirs of Sir Elijah Impey, Knt ... with anecdotes of Warren Hastings, Sir Philip Francis, Nathaniel Brassey Hallhed, Esq., and other contemporaries; (1846)

Sources
The Oxford Dictionary of National Biography (includes photo)

References

External links
The story of Nuncomar and the impeachment of Sir Elijah Impey Cornell University Library Historical Monographs Collection.  {Reprinted by} Cornell University Library Digital Collections
Exhibition of "Lady Impey’s Indian Bird Paintings" at the Ashmolean Museum, Oxford (until 14 Apr 2013) 
"Memoirs of Sir Elijah Impey: Knt., First Chief Justice of the Supreme Court of Judicature, at Fort William, Bengal; with Anecdotes of Warren Hastings, Sir Philip Francis, Nathaniel Brassey Halhed, Esq., and Other Contemporaries; Comp. from Authentic Documents, in Refutation of the Calumnies of the Right Hon. Thomas Babington Macaulay" (Google eBook), Simpkin, Marshall, and Company, 1846

1732 births
1809 deaths
British India judges
Members of the Parliament of Great Britain for English constituencies
British MPs 1790–1796
18th-century British judges
Alumni of Trinity College, Cambridge